The following are the national records in athletics in Kenya maintained by Athletics Kenya (AK).

Outdoor

Key to tables:

+ = en route to a longer distance

h = hand timing

A = affected by altitude

X = unratified due doping violation

a = aided road course according to IAAF rule 260.28

OT = oversized track (> 200m in circumference)

NWI = no wind information

Men

Women

Mixed

Indoor

Men

Women

See also
Kenya national athletics team

Notes

References
General
World Athletics Statistic Handbook 2022: National Outdoor Records
World Athletics Statistic Handbook 2022: National Indoor Records
Kenyan Outdoor Records 2 September 2018 updated
Specific

External links
 AK web site

Kenya
Records
Athletics
Athletics